Martin Stickles (February 7, 1870 – January 25, 1901), known as The Kelso Killer, was an American serial killer who murdered three people in Cowlitz County, Washington, between 1899 and 1900. Convicted of these murders and sentenced to death, he was executed for the killings a year later, despite concerns over a possible mental illness.

Early life
Stickles was born on February 7, 1870, in Adams County, Iowa, but was brought to Washington when he was 18 months old when his whole family moved to the state. According to his mother, Martin was born a sickly child who would always get mad at everybody without any discernible reason, and was considered "unnatural". Little is known about his life before the murders, but by the time of the killings, Stickles was living as a recluse on a scow, sailing along the Columbia, Cowlitz and Coweeman Rivers, earning a living as a fisherman.

Murders

William Shanklin
The first victim was a bachelor farmer named William B. Shanklin, a former neighbor of Stickles whom he had known since an early age. On November 22, 1899, while Shanklin was eating supper at the dinner table of his cabin in Kelso, Martin shot him with a rifle through the window, killing him on the spot. He then broke into the house and stole any valuable items he could find, setting it ablaze to cover up his tracks. Despite the local sheriffs' efforts to solve the case, and a $300 reward from governor John Rankin Rogers, nobody was convicted. Another man, a weaver, was initially tried for the murder but later released, and it was claimed that Stickles had attended the trial.

The Knapp couple

Nearly a year later, on November 28, 1900, Stickles travelled to Castle Rock, where an aged couple, Cornelius Knapp and his wife, were living. While they were having supper at their table, both were fatally shot with a rifle through a window. Like the previous case, Stickles burgled the house and stole all the valuables, though didn't set it on fire.

Trial, imprisonment and execution

Stickles was brought in for interrogation about the killings, protesting his innocence until the investigators revealed that they had identified a watch and some keys as belonging to Shanklin. At that point, Martin confessed to all three murders, but also tried to implicate a neighbor, Edward Pierce, as the shooter and portraying himself as a simple accomplice. In his version of the events, Stickles was swayed by the promised loot and did take an active part in the planning of the murders, but didn't take part of the murders. However, this claim was disputed by the sheriffs, who were convinced that there had been a single shooter, since only a single pair of footprints were found in the snow leading to one of the crime scenes, and Pierce was confirmed to have been at his scow at the Columbia River at the time of the murders. While telling of the crimes, it was noted that Stickles had described them with childish indifference, only occasionally laughing at some parts and apparently feeling joyful when retelling the stories, unaware that he had contradicted himself in several instances.

While awaiting trial for the crimes at the Pierce County jail, in December, the prisoners were visited by members of The Salvation Army. After one of the sermons, apparently moved by the preachers' words, Stickles decided to convert to the Christian faith and admitted before the priests that he alone had committed all the murders. Despite the looming possibility of a death sentence, Stickles remained cheerful, and claimed that he would be happy with whatever sentence was imposed on him by the court. On the date of his arraignment before the Superior Court, he pleaded not guilty. His lawyers and family claimed that Martin should be treated leniently, as he was of unsound mind and had always been unnatural. Despite this, after only an hour of deliberation, the jury found him guilty, and Justice Miller sentenced the defendant to hang. On January 25, 1901, Martin Stickles was brought to the gallows, and after delivering a short speech to the attending parties, he voiced his wish that Jesus would embrace him in Heaven. The rope was then put around his neck and the drop sprung, killing him almost instantly. However, the drop was miscalculated, resulting in flesh being torn off from the murderer's neck and blood spurting out from the wounds. After a few minutes, the psychiatrists checked for a pulse, confirming that Stickles was dead, and quickly turned over the body towards his family for burial. While the final rites were performed, the attendees took notice of a mysterious veiled woman who left shortly after: it was later learned that she had been promised marriage by Stickles via a newspaper ad. This execution later served as a main talking point of an article discussing botched executions in Washington State, along with that of wife murderer Richard Quinn in 1910.

See also
 List of serial killers in the United States
 List of people executed in Washington
 Capital punishment in Washington (state)
 List of botched executions

Notes

References

Bibliography
 True Detective (August 1947 Ed.) - "The Kelso Killer", by Jerry Wallace

External links
 The Last Hanging in Cowlitz County
 Death Certificate
 Execution summary

1870 births
1901 deaths
19th-century American criminals
20th-century American criminals
20th-century executions by Washington (state)
20th-century executions of American people
American male criminals
American people convicted of murder
Criminals from Iowa
Executed American serial killers
Executed people from Iowa
Male serial killers
People convicted of murder by Washington (state)
People executed by Washington (state) by hanging
People executed for murder
People from Adams County, Iowa